Miyakella is a genus of shrimps belonging to the family Squillidae. It is a replacement name for Miyakea Manning, 1995 which was pre-occupied.

Species:
 Miyakella holoschista (Kemp, 1911) 
  Miyakella nepa (Latreille 1828)

References

Stomatopoda
Taxa named by Shane T. Ahyong
Crustaceans described in 2013